Ben Wilden (born 24 April 1985 in Murray Bridge, South Australia) is an Australian trampoline gymnast.  He is a former national champion in trampoline sports and represented Australia at the 2008 Summer Olympics in Beijing as the country's sole representative in trampolining.

Personal life 

Wilden completed his schooling at Murray Bridge High School and Hamilton Secondary College in South Australia. He first started trampolining in his backyard 1994, and only a year later competed at the National Championships in trampoline sports, finishing with second place.

Competition

Wilden has won a number of junior and senior titles in trampoline and has competed at both an Australian national and international level.

Youth Olympic Festivals 

In 2001, Wilden competed at the inaugural Australian Youth Olympic Festival, receiving silver in the synchronised trampoline event. He followed this achievement by winning gold in the same event at the Australian Youth Olympics in 2003. Wilden openly credits this as one of the highlights of his trampolining career because he hyperextended his knee the week prior to the competition, but was still successful in his pursuit for gold.

2008 Beijing Olympics

In 2007, Wilden was selected as a wildcard to represent Australia in the 2008 Beijing Olympics as the country's sole representative in trampolining. His Games entry was gained on the back of his performance at the previous years' World Trampoline Championships in Stuttgart, Germany in which Wilden was the highest-placed Oceania performer of the Championships.

Wilden narrowly missed the Olympic final, receiving total score of 67.10 to finish 13th overall.

References

External links
 Ben Wilden 2007 Australian Champion – AcrobaticSports.com
 08 Trampoline
 
 
 
 
 

Australian male trampolinists
1985 births
Living people
Sportsmen from South Australia
Gymnasts at the 2008 Summer Olympics
Olympic gymnasts of Australia
Medalists at the Trampoline Gymnastics World Championships
Competitors at the 2009 World Games
21st-century Australian people